Kingswood Secondary Academy (formerly The Kingswood School) is a coeducational secondary school and sixth form with academy status, located in Corby, Northamptonshire, England.  It is sponsored by the Greenwood Academies Trust.

History

The school was established as a grammar school in 1965 with 150 students. The school now has over 1,200 students operating on the new school site.  Many changes have taken place in the past two years with the introduction of a new school uniform, vertical tutoring, and a new building.  The school was the subject of a BBC documentary produced by Richard Denton. Filmed in 1981 and broadcast in 1982, it was made 2 years after Dawkins’ earlier sister documentary on public school Radley College.

The Kingswood School was designated a Specialist Arts College in September 2004 after grades were excelling in subjects related to the performing arts. (Dance, Drama, Art, Music and Media Studies)

In 2008 Kingswood saw its highest GCSE pass rate at 54%.

The school used to operate on two sites; the Upper School site, which was for students between the ages of 11-16, and the Lower School, which was once Our Lady and Pope John Catholic Secondary School. The school was taken over by Kingswood in 2004 and its students were then mixed with The Kingswood School's pupils. The Lower School site was then used as a sixth form centre. The disused Our Lady and Pope John site underwent demolition from November 2012, following an arson attack on the site in August 2012. The School is now on one site in the new building.

The school converted to academy status on 1 September 2013 and was renamed Kingswood Secondary Academy.

The new school
The new school is now open and the administration has changed the way the school operates.  There is a vertical tutoring system, which includes a few students from each year and four sixth form students, in which the sixth formers are encouraged to mentor students in year 7.  There are five houses with names related to the performing arts (Aardman, Bourne, Glennie, Hepworth, Littlewood), which each have their own heads, school counselor, school mentor and peer mentors.

References

External links
 Official Website
 Information provided by Schoolnet.com
 Exam result statistics

Secondary schools in North Northamptonshire
Academies in North Northamptonshire
Educational institutions established in 1965
1965 establishments in England